Henry or Harry Baird may refer to:
Harry Baird (actor) (1931–2005), actor who appeared in the science fiction series UFO
Harry Baird (footballer) (1913–1973), Northern Irish footballer
Henry Martyn Baird (1832–1906), American historian and educationalist
Henry S. Baird (1800–1875), American politician
Douglas Baird (Indian Army officer) (Harry Beauchamp Douglas Baird, 1877–1963), British Army officer